Lygephila moellendorffi is a moth of the family Erebidae, genus Lygephila first described by Alfred Otto Herz in 1904. It is found in North Korea.

Etymology
The species was named in honour of Paul von Moellendorff.

References

Moths described in 1904
Toxocampina